Trevesia palmata is a  flowering plant in the family Araliaceae that is found in southeast Asia

References

External links
 
 

palmata
Flora of Vietnam